Aritz Aldasoro Sarriegi (born 5 June 1999) is a Spanish professional footballer who plays as a midfielder for Racing de Santander.

Club career
Aldasoro was born in Beasain, Gipuzkoa, Basque Country, and was a Real Sociedad youth graduate. He made his senior debut with the C-team on 26 August 2017, starting in a 0–2 Tercera División away loss against SCD Durango.

Aldasoro first appeared with the reserves on 30 March 2019, playing the last 13 minutes in a 0–1 away loss against SD Leioa in the Segunda División B championship. He was definitely promoted to the B-side ahead of the 2019–20 season after scoring ten goals for the C's, and renewed his contract until 2022 on 1 July 2020. 

Aldasoro featured regularly for Sanse during the 2020–21 campaign, scoring once in 20 appearances as his side returned to Segunda División after 59 years. He made his professional debut on 14 August 2021, starting in a 1–0 home win over CD Leganés.

On 30 June 2022, Aldasoro moved to newly-promoted side Racing de Santander on a two-year contract.

References

External links

1999 births
Living people
People from Beasain
Sportspeople from Gipuzkoa
Spanish footballers
Footballers from the Basque Country (autonomous community)
Association football midfielders
Segunda División players
Segunda División B players
Tercera División players
Real Sociedad C footballers
Real Sociedad B footballers
Racing de Santander players